The Irish question was the issue debated primarily among the British government from the early 19th century until the 1920s of how to respond to Irish nationalism and the calls for Irish independence.

The phrase came to prominence as a result of the Acts of Union 1800 which merged the kingdoms of Ireland with Great Britain to create the United Kingdom, and merged the Parliament of Ireland into a single governing body with the Parliament of Great Britain; the Parliament of the United Kingdom based in Westminster. Doing so forced the British government to pay closer attention to the state of Ireland and its people.

In 1844, a future British prime minister, Benjamin Disraeli, defined the Irish question:

 
In the United Kingdom general election of 1868, a coalition of Liberals and Irish Nationalists formed based on the fact that a wrong was done to Ireland and that it must be corrected. From the general election of 1868 to 1929, and most likely past the latter year, the Liberal Party's primary platform of reform was based on Irish reform. During the first ministry of William Ewart Gladstone, a total of three "grievances" were made to him by the Irish: "religious, agrarian, and nationalist". These were, but not limited to, the Roman Catholic faith being persecuted since the 16th century, the poverty wrought upon by legislation, such as Ireland's woollen industry, and English landlords, and "Poyning's Law", which held the Irish government's action subject to the acceptation of the government of England under King Henry VII.

In 1886, with the introduction of the first Home Rule Bill in the House of Commons, the term the Anglo-Irish quarrel gained favour and  became more acceptable than the implied condescension of the Irish question.

The Irish question affected British politics in much the same way that the nationalities problem affected Austria-Hungary. Normal British domestic issues could not be adequately addressed because of the political divisions created by the oppression of Ireland. The Liberal Party split over Home Rule, with the unionist faction leaving to create the Liberal Unionist Party, ceding control to the Conservatives, thus hurting the cause of further social and political reform.

Post-independence and contemporary usage
Following Irish independence and the partition of the island in the 1920s, issues relating to Northern Ireland have often been referred to as either "The Troubles" or "The Irish Problem".

In 2017, the term was also used to describe issues associated with the UK-Irish border and Brexit. The term Irish border question has been used more widely in recent years.

See also
 Armenian question
 Aromanian question
 Condition-of-England question
 German question
 Jewish question
 Negro question
 Polish question
 The Race Question

References

Further reading
 Case, Holly. The Age of Questions (Princeton University Press, 2018)  excerpt

History of Ireland (1801–1923)
19th century in the United Kingdom
National questions